Matagami Water Aerodrome  was located  south of Matagami, Quebec, Canada.

See also
 Matagami Airport

References

Defunct seaplane bases in Quebec